The 2003 European Wrestling Championships were held in the men's Greco-Roman in Belgrade and men's freestyle style, and the women's freestyle in Riga.

Medal table

Medal summary

Men's freestyle

Men's Greco-Roman

Women's freestyle

References

External links
Fila's official championship website

Europe
European Wrestling Championships
Sports competitions in Riga
Sports competitions in Belgrade
2003 in European sport
Wrestling in Latvia
International wrestling competitions hosted by Serbia